The Pinkenba Six is a group of Queensland police officers charged with the abduction of three Aboriginal boys in May 1994. The six were not jailed and the charges were dropped.

The crime
The three boys, aged 12, 13, and 14, were ordered into a police car by the six officers in Brisbane's Fortitude Valley. Each boy was driven in a separate patrol car to a swampy area in Pinkenba, Queensland. The officers threatened to throw the boys into the swampy wasteland, and referred to a place where people's fingers were cut off, in order to get them to comply with their demands. The boys were abandoned after their shoes were removed. The boys later retrieved their shoes and began to walk home. They finished the journey in a taxi paid for by a security guard they met along the way.

Outcome
Police later admitted that the boys had not previously committed any crimes but were taken to deter them from committing any crimes or being a public nuisance.

Following an investigation by the Criminal Justice Commission, the Public Prosecutor laid charges against the police for deprivation of liberty.  The charges were later dropped after a magistrate found the boys agreed to go with the police officers. The officers were put on probation for one year by the police service, not as a court sentence.

One of the Pinkenba Six was Mark Ellis, who was a One Nation candidate in Queensland until his withdrawal in 2017.

Bibliography 
 Prenzler, Tim. Police Corruption: Preventing Misconduct and Maintaining Integrity. Boca Raton, Florida: CRC, 2009. Print.

References

History of Queensland
Law enforcement in Queensland
Police misconduct in Australia